APSA - Aeroexpreso Bogotá was an airline based in Bogotá, Colombia. It was established in 1978 and provided air transport, using aircraft and helicopters, mainly for major oil companies. It had 59 employees and its main base was El Dorado International Airport, Bogotá. APSA broke up its business in 2007.

Fleet 
The APSA fleet consisted of the following aircraft:

1 Dornier 228-212
1 de Havilland Canada DHC-6 Twin Otter
1 Fairchild Metro 23
1 Learjet 35A

References

External links
APSA

Defunct airlines of Colombia
Airlines established in 1978
Airlines disestablished in 2007